Friedrich Wagner, best known as Fritz Wagner, (21 December 1913 - 9 September 1987) was a Swiss footballer who played for Switzerland in the 1938 FIFA World Cup. He also played for Grasshopper Club Zürich.

References

Swiss men's footballers
Switzerland international footballers
1938 FIFA World Cup players
Association football forwards
Grasshopper Club Zürich players
1913 births
1987 deaths